George Thomas Regas (Greek: Γεώργιος Θωμάς Ρεγάκος; November 9, 1890 – December 13, 1940) was a Greek American actor.

Biography
Regis was born in the village of Goranoi near Sparta, Greece, the brother of actor Pedro Regas. He was a stage actor in Athens before coming to the United States. In New York City he played Romeo in a Grecian version of Romeo and Juliet.

In 1921, Regas acted in his first motion picture, The Love Light with Mary Pickford. This film was produced by Pickford's production company. He would go on to create character roles in over one hundred films. His rugged looks and Mediterranean complexion allowed him to play a wide variety of nationalities in action and adventure films. He was married to actress Reine Davies, the sister of Marion Davies. He starred as Mateo in The Adventures of Sherlock Holmes (1939).

On Broadway, Regas portrayed Pedro in Zombie (1932).

Death
Regas died In St. Vincent's Hospital after an operation for a throat infection on December 13, 1940, in Hollywood, California, at age fifty. His last film role was Sergeant Gonzales in The Mark of Zorro. He is entombed at Hollywood Forever Cemetery alongside his brother.

Partial filmography

 The Love Light (1921) - Tony
 The Dangerous Moment (1921) - Movros Tarkides
 Omar the Tentmaker (1922) - Emissary to the Shah
 The Rip-Tide (1923) - The Philosopher
 Fashionable Fakers (1923) - A. Turk
 The Sea Hawk (1924) - Oarsman (uncredited)
 The Wanderer (1925) - Gaal
 That Royle Girl (1925) - Baretta's Henchman
 Desert Gold (1926) - Verd
 Beau Geste (1926) - Maris
 The Rescue (1929) - Wasub
 Redskin (1929) - Notani
 Wolf Song (1929) - Black Wolf
 The Wheel of Life (1929) - Bit Role (uncredited)
 Sea Fury (1929) - Captain
 Acquitted (1929) - Tony (billed as George Rigas)
 Alma de Gaucho (1930) - Don Casimiro
 The Lonesome Trail (1930) - The Ring Tailored Roarer
 Beau Ideal (1931) - The Emir
 Caught Cheating (1931) - Giuseppe
 Riders of the North (1931) - Leclerc
 Trapped (1931) - Jim Moore
 City Streets (1931) - Machine Gunner (uncredited)
 Newly Rich (1931) - Lippo (uncredited)
 Hell-Bent for Frisco (1931) - Tony
 Danger Island (1931, Serial) - Lascara
 Battling with Buffalo Bill (1931) - Henchman Breed Johns
 Mounted Fury (1931) - Pierre LeStrange
 The Golden West (1932) - Chief Black Wolf (uncredited)
 Destination Unknown (1933) - Tauru
 Central Airport (1933) - Havana Mechanic (uncredited)
 The Phantom of the Air (1933, Serial) - Ship Captain (uncredited)
 The Way to Love (1933) - Pedro
 Blood Money (1933) - Charley
 Sixteen Fathoms Deep (1934) - Theo Savanis
 Viva Villa! (1934) - Don Rodrigo
 Grand Canary (1934) - El Dazo (uncredited)
 Bulldog Drummond Strikes Back (1934) - Singh
 Fighting Trooper (1934) - Henri
 Kid Millions (1934) - Attendant (uncredited)
 The Marines Are Coming (1934) - The Torch (uncredited)
 Red Morning (1934) - Native (uncredited)
 Bordertown (1935) - Guillermo - Jailer in Mexico (uncredited)
 The Lives of a Bengal Lancer (1935) - Kushal Khan (uncredited)
 Under Pressure (1935) - Ruby, the Greek (uncredited)
 Eight Bells (1935) - Pedro (uncredited)
 The Red Blood of Courage (1935) - Frenchy - Henchman
 In Caliente (1935) - First Motor Cop (uncredited)
 Pursuit (1935) - Mexican Border Patrolman (uncredited)
 Here's to Romance (1935) - Greek Husband (uncredited)
 Night Cargo (1936) - Gus Noble
 Rose Marie (1936) - Boniface
 Hell-Ship Morgan (1936) - Covanci
 Robin Hood of El Dorado (1936) - Tomás
 The Girl from Mandalay (1936) - Headman
 Under Two Flags (1936) - Keskerdit (uncredited)
 Sworn Enemy (1936) - Greek - a Gangster (uncredited)
 Isle of Fury (1936) - Otar
 Rebellion (1936) - Gang Member (uncredited)
 Daniel Boone (1936) - Black Eagle
 The Charge of the Light Brigade (1936) - Wazir
 Waikiki Wedding (1937) - Muamua
 Left-Handed Law (1937) - Sam Logan
 Another Dawn (1937) - Sheik Achaben (scenes deleted)
 The Californian (1937) - Ruiz
 The Legion of Missing Men (1937) - Sgt. Garcia
 Love Under Fire (1937) - Lieutenant De Vega
 Charlie Chan on Broadway (1937) - Hindu (uncredited)
 Ali Baba Goes to Town (1937) - Bearded Arab (uncredited)
 Clipped Wings (1937) - Fernando - Moran's Henchman
 The Mysterious Pilot (1937, Serial) - RCAF Constable Remington (uncredited)
 Hawaiian Buckaroo (1938) - Regas
 Torchy Blane in Panama (1938) - Gomez
 Four Men and a Prayer (1938) - Egyptian Policeman (uncredited)
 The Toy Wife (1938) - Man Shot in Court (uncredited)
 Mr. Moto Takes a Chance (1938) - Bokor
 Arrest Bulldog Drummond (1938) - Soongh
 Scouts to the Rescue (1939) - Lokola -Indian Tribe High Priest
 Gunga Din (1939) - Thug Chieftain (uncredited)
 The Oklahoma Kid (1939) - Pedro (uncredited)
 Union Pacific (1939) - Indian Hearing Mollie's Telegraphy (uncredited)
 Code of the Secret Service (1939) - Mexican Police Officer
 Beau Geste (1939) - Arab Scout (uncredited)
 The Adventures of Sherlock Holmes (1939) - Matteo
 The Rains Came (1939) - Rajput (uncredited)
 The Cat and the Canary (1939) - Indian Guide
 The Mad Empress (1939) - Mariano Escobedo
 The Light That Failed (1939) - Cassavetti
 Virginia City (1940) - Murrell's Halfbreed Henchman (uncredited)
 'Til We Meet Again (1940) - Mexican Bartender (uncredited)
 Torrid Zone (1940) - Sergeant of Police
 North West Mounted Police (1940) - Freddie (uncredited)
 The Mark of Zorro (1940) - Sergeant Gonzales (final film role)

References

External links

1890 births
1940 deaths
Greek emigrants to the United States
Burials at Hollywood Forever Cemetery
Greek male film actors
Greek male stage actors
Male Western (genre) film actors
People from Laconia